Doctor Doctor is an Australian drama series that premiered on Nine Network on 16 September 2016. It is known internationally as The Heart Guy.

The series, including its cast, have been nominated for several awards including the AACTA Awards, the Casting Guild of Australia, the Screen Producers Australia, and multiple nominations at the Logie Awards. As of 2021, it has not been the recipient of any awards.

AACTA Awards

Casting Guild of Australia

Logie Awards

Screen Producers Australia

TV Tonight Awards

Notes

References

Lists of awards by television series